Joshua Gans holds the Jeffrey Skoll Chair in Technical Innovation and Entrepreneurship at the Rotman School of Management, University of Toronto.  Until 2011, he was an economics professor at Melbourne Business School in Australia. His research focuses on competition policy and intellectual property protection. He is the author of several textbooks and policy books, as well as numerous articles in economics journals. He operates two blogs: one on economic policy, and another on economics and parenting.

Born in 1968, he spent the first 11 years of his life in Sydney (attending Vaucluse Public School before moving to Brisbane in 1979. He attended the private boys Brisbane Grammar School before receiving a Bachelor of Economics (Honours) and the University Medal from the University of Queensland, and later attended Stanford University for his Ph.D. in economics. His supervisors were Paul Milgrom, Kenneth J. Arrow and Avner Greif. He graduated from Stanford in 1995; having already returned to Australia to take up a lectureship in the School of Economics, University of New South Wales. He moved to Melbourne Business School in 1996 as an associate professor and became a full professor in 2000.

In 2007, Gans received the inaugural young economist award from the Economic Society of Australia. This is an award given every two years to the best economist working in Australia who is aged under 40.

Presently, Gans teaches at Rotman School of Management at the University of Toronto in Canada. He also serves as chief economist of the Creative Destruction Lab. Gans is also department editor (business strategy) at Management Science.

Books 
 The Pandemic Information Solution: Overcoming the Brutal Economics of Covid-19, Endeavor Literary Press, 2021.
 The Pandemic Information Gap: The Brutal Economics of COVID-19, MIT Press, 2020.
 Economics in the Age of COVID-19, MIT Press First Reads, 2020.
 Innovation + Equality: How to create a future that is more Star Trek than Terminator, (with Andrew Leigh) MIT Press, 2019.
 Prediction Machines: The Simple Economics of Artificial Intelligence, (with Ajay Agrawal and Avi Goldfarb) Harvard Business Review Press, 2018.
 Scholarly Publishing and its Discontents, Core Research Press, 2017.
 The Disruption Dilemma, MIT Press, 2016.
 Information Wants to be Shared, Harvard Business Review Press, 2012.
 Parentonomics, MIT Press: Cambridge, 2009.
 Core Economics for Managers, Thomson Learning: Melbourne, 2005.
 Finishing the Job: Real World Policy Solutions in Housing, Health, Education and Transport (with Stephen King), Melbourne University Publishing: Melbourne, 2004.
Principles of Economics (with Stephen King, Robin Stonecash and N. Gregory Mankiw), 3rd Pacific Rim Edition, Thomson, 2005 (2nd Pacific Rim Edition, Thomson, 2003, 1st Australasian Edition, Harcourt, Sydney, 2000).
Publishing Economics: Analyses of the Academic Journal Market in Economics (edited volume), Edward Elgar, Cheltnam, 2000.
Principles of Macroeconomics (with Robin Stonecash, Stephen King and N. Gregory Mankiw), 3rd Pacific Rim Edition, Thomson, 2005 (2nd Pacific Rim Edition, Thomson, 2003, 1st Australasian Edition, Harcourt-Brace, Sydney, 1999).
Principles of Microeconomics (with Stephen King and N. Gregory Mankiw), 23rd Pacific Rim Edition, Thomson, 2005 (2nd Pacific Rim Edition, Thomson, 2003, 1st Australasian Edition, Harcourt-Brace, Sydney, 1999)

References

External links 
 Joshua Gans's website
 Digitopoly blog
 Core Economics blog
 Joshua Gans's Game Theorist blog
 Profile of Joshua Gans in The Australian newspaper, 7 November 2007
 Prediction Machines Website
 Parentonomics Website
 Rotman School of Management - Rotman Professor Receives Grant from Sloan Foundation

1968 births
Academic staff of the University of Melbourne
Australian bloggers
Australian economists
Living people
University of Queensland alumni
Stanford University alumni
Innovation economists